Gilbert Delé (born 1 January 1964) is a French former professional boxer who competed from 1986 to 1993. He held the WBA light-middleweight title in 1991 and challenged twice for the IBF light-middleweight title in 1992 and 1993. At regional level he held the European light-middleweight title from 1989 to 1990.

Career
Delé turned pro in 1986, and captured the vacant WBA light middleweight title in 1991 with a technical knockout over Carlos Elliott. He defended the belt once before losing it to Vinny Pazienza later that year. He retired in 1993 after unsuccessfully challenging IBF light-middleweight title holder Gianfranco Rosi twice.

See also
List of WBA world champions

References

External links

1964 births
French people of Guadeloupean descent
Light-middleweight boxers
Living people
World boxing champions
French male boxers